The Lemnian Athena, or Athena Lemnia, was a classical Greek statue of the goddess Athena. According to geographer Pausanias (1.28.2), the original bronze cast was created by the sculptor Phidias circa 450–440 BCE, for Athenians living on the island of Lemnos to dedicate on the Acropolis of Athens.

It is unclear whether any copies survived. In 1891, German archaeologist Adolf Furtwängler reconstructed two virtually identical Roman marble statues which he claimed were copies of the original, and identified two Roman marble copies of the head alone. These completed statues were recreated by joining a poorly preserved marble head (kept at Dresden) and a plaster cast of a similar Roman marble head, from the collection of Pelagio Palagi in Bologna, to a pair of identical bodies in Dresden. However, both reconstructions and attributions have been disputed; see below.

The  sculptures concerned are:

 Two full reconstructions (A and B) in the Staatliche Museum, Albertinum, Dresden, with bodies purchased in 1728 from the Chigi collection, Rome, Italy.
 The Palagi head at the Archaeological Museum of Bologna, Italy.
A further head of this type, found at Pozzuoli is conserved in the Archaeological Museum of the Campi Phlegraei.
As reconstructed, the completed statues are pastiches of two Roman marbles, one for the head and the other for the body. In them, Athena wears an unusual, cross-slung aegis decorated with the Gorgon's head. She is bare-headed, without a shield, holding her helmet out in her extended right hand, and with her left grasping her spear near the top of the shaft.

Furtwängler's identification of the original Athena Lemnia with the Dresden statues and Palagi head was based upon study of an engraved gem and by interpretation of the following passages from contemporary reports by Pausanias, Lucian, and Himerius:

 Pausanias 1.28.2:
[On the Acropolis] there are also two other dedications, a statue of Pericles, son of Xanthippus, and the most worth seeing of the works of Phidias, the statue of Athena called the Lemnian after those who dedicated it.

 Lucian, Imagines 4 and 6:
(4) Lykinos: "Of all the works of Phidias, which one do you praise most highly?"
Polystratos: "Which if not the Lemnia, on which he thought fit to inscribe his name? Or the Amazon leaning on her spear?
 ...
(6) From the Knidia the sculptor [of Panthea] will take only the head, ... allowing the hair, forehead, and that lovely brow-line to remain just as Praxiteles made them, and the liquid yet clear and winsome gaze of the eyes shall stay as Praxiteles conceived it. But he will take the curve of the cheeks and the fore part of the face from Alkamenes' [Aphrodite] in the Gardens, plus her hands, graceful wrists, and supple, tapering fingers. But the facial contour, its softness, and her well-proportioned nose will be supplied by the Lemnian Athena of Phidias, who will also furnish the meeting of the lips and the neck, taken from the Amazon."

 Himerios, Oratio 68.4 (Colonna):
Phidias did not always make images of Zeus, nor did he always cast Athena armed into bronze, but turned his art to the other gods and adorned the Maiden's cheeks with a rosy blush, so that in place of her helmet this should cover the goddess's beauty.

Furtwängler's logic has been disputed. "Hartswick has shown that the Palagi head in Bologna cannot have come from Dresden statue B, that the gems Furtwängler employed could be post-antique, and that the sources are impossibly vague." (Stewart) Some of Hartwick's own conclusions have been disputed in turn, i.e., that the head of Dresden A is alien and the entire Palagi type is Hadrianic. Stewart remarks, "So while the type remains intact and looks Phidian, Furtwängler's further hypotheses concerning its identity and date (451-448) remain unproven."

Notes

References 
 www.goddess-athena.org
 Kim J. Hartswick, "The Athena Lemnia reconsidered", American Journal of Archaeology, 87.3 (July 1983), pp. 335–346.
Olga Palagia, "In Defense of Furtwangler's Athena Lemnia", American Journal of Archaeology, 91.1 (January 1987), pp. 81–84.
Judith M. Barringer, Jeffrey M. Hurwit, J. J. Pollitt, Periklean Athens and Its Legacy: Problems and Perspectives, (University of Texas Press), 2005. .
 Alexander S. Murray, A History of Greek Sculpture, 1880, (reprint: Kessinger Publishing, 2004), .
 Edward Robinson, Catalogue of Casts, Museum of Fine Arts, Boston; Houghton, Mifflin, 1896, pages 86–89.
 Stewart, Andrew. One Hundred Greek Sculptors: Their Careers and Extant Works
 The Sculptors: The Early and High Classic Periods (on-line text)
 Cast

Athena Lemnia
Sculptures by Phidias
Lost sculptures
Ancient Lemnos
Sculptures of Athena